Datzetal is a municipality in the district Mecklenburgische Seenplatte, in Mecklenburg-Vorpommern, Germany.

References

Municipalities in Mecklenburg-Western Pomerania